Ngoma (also ng'oma or ing'oma) is a Bantu term with many connotations that encompasses music, dance, and instruments. In Tanzania ngoma also refers to events, both significant life-changing events such as the first menstruation or the birth or passing of a loved one, as well as momentary events such as celebrations, rituals, or competitions. Ngoma was the primary form of culture throughout the Great Lakes and Southern Africa. Today it is most notable in Tanzania, where it is deemed an official music genre by the National Arts Council (BASATA - Baraza la Sanaa la Taifa). In Tanzania, it is experienced throughout the country and performed, taught, and studied in many schools and universities. The most notable school for ngoma is the Bagamoyo Arts and Cultural Institute, which produces the most prominent chairmen (directors/conductors) and dancers.

The traditional forms of ngoma dancing consist of prominent movements of the hips. It uses a large variety of instruments, including strings and horns, but most prominently the use of drums. In other cases no instruments are used, such as by the Ambrokoi of the Maasai or the Ligihu of the Ngoni. These are usually dances of jumping and stomping, with significant movement and often a more competitive aspect than those with instruments.

History 
Before colonization, ngoma was the dominant form of culture throughout the Great Lakes. One of the primary functions of ngoma was as an interaction between elders and youth. This served primarily as a means to teach the youth, and learn about the youth so as to know how to guide them better in life. During colonization, ngoma was outlawed as colonial administrations viewed it as unchristian and holding back the civilizing process. Tanzanians created a new form of ngoma called mganda in the hope that it would appeal to the colonial administrators. Mganda ngoma adopted the costumes of western military uniforms and dress. It also adopted some of the military instruments. This would eventually become a form of big band music. Eventually, the first clubs opened in Dar es Salaam and Tanga for these mganda ngoma bands, be played on the radio, and recorded. Mganda ngoma music would explode in popularity and become known as dansi (dance jazz) today. After independence, the government of Tanzania (TAMU) placed a very strong emphasis on returning to traditional ngoma.

While this was somewhat successful, TAMU was never able to fully achieve the goals set out by Nyerere's inaugural address. Even TAMU still used dansi and kwaya as primary tools for education, national and political purposes. TAMU was successful in promoting arts in general, including establishing centers for art education. It also allowed the tribes to return to practicing ngoma freely, which most had been doing in the dark throughout colonization. Following the economic reforms of 1985, ngoma has changed its societal role in national and tribal life. While still very popular, it is rarely taught by elders to the youths as was its traditional role in the past. Nonetheless ngoma is still very popular and widespread today. Ngoma troupes have turned to modernizing and commercializing the music and dance, to compete commercially. One dance may include aspects of as great a variety of tribal and geographic ranges as possible to appeal to as broad an audience as possible, particularly elders, while also using many inspirations from other genres such as dansi or bongo flava to appeal to the youths. Additionally ngoma has modernized its use of instruments. Many traditional instruments are no longer available or possible to make. Today modern manufactured instruments and gear, such as guitars, keyboards, microphones, and amplifiers are usually used.

References

Further reading
 
 </ref>
 
 
 
 

 Music history
 African music genres
 Tanzanian culture
 Tanzanian music
 African dances
 Dance music genres